X2 is an arcade-style side-scrolling shoot 'em up released during the Team17-Ocean collaboration era of video games that created the Worms series. It is the sequel to the Amiga shooter Project-X. Unlike its predecessor, this game was a console exclusive. Acclaim Entertainment was slated to publish the game in North America, but it was never released in that region. A Sega Saturn version of the game was scrapped during development, at least in part due to Acclaim (who would have published it in North America, as with the PlayStation version) withdrawing support for the Saturn.

Retired pilot Commander Miner is called out of retirement as he is one of the best and last remaining pilots qualified to take the fight to the invading aliens.

Unlike most shoot 'em ups, X2 allows the player to keep the power-ups they have acquired when they lose a life.

Reception
The Electronic Gaming Monthly review team gave the game a 5.75 out of 10, with all four reviewers save Sushi-X agreeing that the game looks good but is frustratingly difficult to the point where it is not fun to play, with numerous points where it is impossible to avoid taking hits. GamePros Gideon commented, "Although the graphics and sound effects are above average, the overall game experience is too chaotic; in fact, at times it's difficult to identify shots onscreen or to differentiate your own firepower from that of your enemies."

References

External links
 Gamespot: X2 for PS

1996 video games
Cancelled Sega Saturn games
PlayStation (console) games
PlayStation (console)-only games
Science fiction video games
Horizontally scrolling shooters
Team17 games
Video game sequels
Video games scored by Bjørn Lynne
Ocean Software games
Capcom games
Multiplayer and single-player video games
Video games developed in the United Kingdom